This is a list of Kosovo national football team results from 1993 to 2019.

History

First match
On 14 February 1993. Following the breakup of Yugoslavia, the first match of Kosovo was played and it was against Albania and the match ended with a 1–3 away defeat and the starting line-up of that match was Ahmet Beselica, Ardian Kozniku, Bardhyl Seferi, Fadil Berisha, Gani Llapashtica, Genc Hoxha, Isa Sadriu, Kushtrim Munishi, Muharrem Sahiti, Sadullah Ajeti and Selaudin Jerlini.

2002–2010
On 7 September 2002, Kosovo for first time after the Kosovo War played a friendly match against Albania and the match ended with a 0–1 home minimal defeat and the starting line-up of that match was Ahmet Beselica, Ardian Kozniku, Arsim Abazi, Besnik Kollari, Fadil Ademi, Faruk Statovci, Ismet Munishi, Mehmet Dragusha, Sunaj Keqi, Xhevdet Llumnica and Zenun Selimi.

Five games were played after the match against Albania, one of the most important international matches was a 1–0 win over Saudi Arabia played on 15 June 2007. It was the first time that Kosovo played against a team that has taken part in the FIFA World Cup and the winning goal was scored by Kristian Nushi from the penalty kick on the 84th minute.

On 17 February 2010 for first time since the declaration of independence, Kosovo played a friendly match against Albania and the match ended with a 2–3 home defeat. The starting line-up of that match was Anel Rashkaj, Dukagjin Gashi, Enis Zabërgja, Fisnik Papuçi, Ilir Nallbani, Kushtrim Mushica, Liridon Kukaj, Robert Gjeraj, Shpëtim Hasani and Yll Hoxha. This match had a humanitarian character, because the profits gathered from this meeting will go to those affected by floods in Shkodër.

2014–2015

After four years pause and following FIFA's ruling for permitting to play friendlies, on 5 March 2014, Kosovo played its first international friendly against Haiti and the match ended in a 0–0 draw. After the match against Haiti, five more games were held with Turkey, Senegal, Oman, Equatorial Guinea and in the end with Albania. The first win in these friendlies was against Oman with a 1–0 home minimal win, while the biggest defeat that was simultaneously also the first defeat was a 1–6 home defeat against Turkey that was playing with players that were the majority from Turkish championship.

2016–present
On 3 June 2016, Kosovo played its first international friendly after the membership in UEFA and FIFA against Faroe Islands and the match ended in a 2–0 win.

Participation in 2018 FIFA World Cup qualifications
On 9 June 2016, The UEFA Emergency Panel has decided that Kosovo will join Croatia, Finland, Iceland, Turkey and Ukraine in Group I, also decided that Bosnia and Herzegovina and Serbia should not play against Kosovo for security reasons. On 5 September 2016, Kosovo made their debut on FIFA World Cup qualifications with a 1–1 away draw against Finland and the draw goal was scored by the newcomer Valon Berisha from the penalty kick on the 60th minute. Kosovo finished these qualifications with nine losses and a draw and that brought the resignation of the coach at that time, Albert Bunjaki.

Return to positive results
After the weak results during 2018 FIFA World Cup qualifications and resignation of the coach at that time, Albert Bunjaki. The Former Kosovo international midfielder and assistant coach of Kosovo during Bunjaki era, Muharrem Sahiti was appointed as caretaker manager and his duty was the return to positive results, which he accomplished on 13 November 2017 when Kosovo won the first match at home in Mitrovica against Latvia with result 4–3.

On 2 March 2018, Kosovo signed with Bernard Challandes to a two-year contract and after 22 days from receiving the manager post, he won the first match against Madagascar with result 1–0. Challandes continued his work in leave in half by the Sahiti and despite the victory over Madagascar, I won other friendly matches as against Burkina Faso and Albania, while 2018 continues with debut on UEFA Nations League with a 0–0 away draw against Azerbaijan, the first win in UEFA Nations League that was simultaneously also the first-ever competitive win was a 2–0 home win against Faroe Islands and the culmination was positioning in first place and promoting in League C in the next season of UEFA Nations League.

Fixtures and results
The following is a list of matches of Kosovo since 1993.

Unofficial

Official

2014

2015

2016

2017

2018

2019

Kosovo versus other countries
.

Notes and references

Notes

References

External links
 
Kosovo at National Football Teams
Kosovo at RSSSF

Senior